João Rodrigo Pereira Escoval (born 8 May 1997) is a Portuguese professional footballer who plays as a central defender for Super League Greece club Volos.

Club career
Escoval was born in Lisbon. He joined S.L. Benfica's youth system at the age of 10, signing from SG Sacavenense also in the region.

On 24 August 2016, Escoval made his professional debut for the B team, playing the full 90 minutes in a 2–1 away win against F.C. Vizela in the LigaPro. He contributed a further nine starts until the end of the season, helping to a final fourth position.

On 18 August 2017, the 20-year-old Escoval and teammate Filipe Ferreira were sold to NK Istra 1961 from the Croatian First Football League, as Mato Miloš moved in the opposite direction. On 10 January 2018, he signed a -year contract with fellow league club HNK Rijeka with a three-year extension option. He scored his first top-flight goal while in service of the latter side, opening the 2–0 away victory over NK Varaždin on 28 September 2019.

Escoval joined Anorthosis Famagusta F.C. of the Cypriot First Division on 31 January 2022, until June 2023.

Career statistics

Club

Honours
Rijeka
Croatian Football Cup: 2018–19, 2019–20

References

External links

1997 births
Living people
Portuguese footballers
Footballers from Lisbon
Association football defenders
Liga Portugal 2 players
Casa Pia A.C. players
S.L. Benfica B players
Croatian Football League players
NK Istra 1961 players
HNK Rijeka players
Cypriot First Division players
Anorthosis Famagusta F.C. players
Super League Greece players
Volos N.F.C. players
Portuguese expatriate footballers
Expatriate footballers in Croatia
Expatriate footballers in Cyprus
Expatriate footballers in Greece
Portuguese expatriate sportspeople in Croatia
Portuguese expatriate sportspeople in Cyprus
Portuguese expatriate sportspeople in Greece